N'astirh is a fictional character appearing in American comic books published by Marvel Comics. The character was created as a demonic inhabitant of Otherplace.

Publication history

N'astirh first appeared in X-Factor #32 and was created by Louise Simonson and Jon Bogdanove.

Fictional character biography
N'astirh was a demon with great magical skills and a master manipulator. Despite his power and loyalty to his lord Belasco, Belasco passes him over as a potential apprentice, seeing demons as fit only to be servants. When Illyana Rasputin rises up to replace Belasco as lord of Otherplace, N'astirh steals Belasco's spellbook and flees from Limbo into Earth's past. After years of study, he masters all the spells in the book.

N'astirh makes an alliance with Cameron Hodge. N'astirh's demons then kidnap Artie Maddicks and Leech. Using Belasco's stolen book of spells, N'astirh sends demons to abduct mutant infants, and is brought computer expert Wiz Kid as a captive. N'astirh is informed by Cameron Hodge about Mister Sinister's orphanage for mutant children. N'astirh coerces Wiz Kid to create a computer to process magic. When the Hobgoblin offers to make a Faustian bargain to trade his soul for the power of a demon, N'astirh scoffs at the offer, and on a whim, he grants Hobgoblin the requested power free of charge by fusing him with a demon, which would eventually break away to become the Demogoblin. Archangel vows vengeance on N'astirh for the encouragement he provided to Cameron Hodge. N'astirh also makes a pact with Madelyne Pryor, who uses this alliance to get revenge against the Marauders and the safe return of her son Nathan.

Madelyne Pryor, N'astirh and S'ym plot a demonic invasion, starting with Manhattan. N'astirh and S'ym manipulate Illyana Rasputin into opening an inter-dimensional portal at the Empire State Building, through which N'astirh's demons invade Manhattan. Kang the Conqueror sends his minion, the Growing Man to attack N'astirh's demon horde.  During the invasion, N'astirh coerces Illyana, Meggan, and Madelyne towards their darker sides, Magik having a tie to Limbo, Meggan being an empathic shapeshifter who is swayed by the dark emotions around her (transforming her into the Goblin Princess), and Madelyne having her psionic powers triggered, transforming her into the Goblin Queen.  Illyana eventually closes the portal, sealing the demons in Limbo.

While N'astirh battles S'ym for rule of Limbo and Earth, he is infected and transformed by the transmode virus. He claims he has 'become' magic, since he can now process and cast spells almost simultaneously.

N'astirh captures Nathan Christopher Summers. When N'astirh learns Madelyne has fallen into madness, he returns and presents Madylyne her son as chief sacrifice. He is ultimately destroyed by an overload of lightning driven into him by Storm.

Much later, N'astirh was apparently resurrected by Illyana Rasputin, who herself had been resurrected by Belasco. He no longer seems to possess the enhancements and abilities given to him as a result of his exposure to the techno-organic virus. He also appears to be far more animalistic and savage than before and has not displayed any of the cunning and manipulative personality traits he once had.

He returns during the Second Coming event, where is revealed that N'astirth is the mastermind who abducted Magik, after he and S'ym cut a deal with Bastion's forces and provided them with a "weaponized ritual" that sent Magik back to Limbo.

Powers and abilities
Vast magical powers grant him the ability to manipulate the forces of magic for various effects, generate mystical energy as force bolts and protective shields, increase his size and strength, regenerate his injuries and tap into the innate evil of humans and turn them into demons with a touch. He also has the ability of flight due to his natural leather wings.

Transformation by the techno-organic transmode virus allows him the ability to alter his own shape and can rebuild his body from a single cell when destroyed or injured, and he can infect others with the transmode virus, converting them into "techno-organic" beings and absorbing their life energy. The virus also granted him a computer like mind allowing him to cast spells and process them almost simultaneously.

N'astirh has a gifted intellect, and possesses extensive knowledge of black magic gained through study of Belasco's principal book of sorcery.

In other media

Video games
 Android replicas of N'astirh appear in Spider-Man/X-Men: Arcade's Revenge as mini-bosses.
 N'astirh appears in Marvel Heroes, voiced by Steven Blum.

References

External links
 N'astirh at Marvel.com
 Uncannyxmen.net bio
 

Characters created by Louise Simonson
Comics characters introduced in 1988
Marvel Comics demons
Marvel Comics male supervillains